Princess in Training is the sixth volume of the Princess Diaries series by Meg Cabot. It was first published in 2005. In the United Kingdom, it was released under the title Sixational.

Plot Summary
The book begins with the first day of Mia Thermopolis's sophomore year at the fictional Albert Einstein High School after spending the summer in Genovia. Michael Mocovitz, Mia's boyfriend, is now a freshman at Columbia University and Lilly Moscovitz, Mia's best friend, is still getting over her depression after the end of her relationship with violin prodigy Boris Pelkowski, who is not only still dating Tina Hakim Baba, but has also gotten unexpectedly hot over the summer break.

As the first English lesson of the year begins, Mia, Lilly and Tina pass notes saying how great they think their new English teacher, Ms. Martinez, is. However, when Ms. Martinez grades one of her essays harshly, Mia turns against her. Everything is going well until lunchtime, when Lana Weinberger, Mia's arch-enemy, tells Mia that college boys expect their girlfriends to "do it" with them. This freaks Mia out because she is positive that she is not ready to sleep with anyone.  Lilly wants Mia her to run for student counsel president and nominates her to run against Lana.

A stressful school week ends and Mia visits Michael's dorm on Saturday (after a big sleepover at the Plaza with Lily, Tina, Ling Su Wong, and Shameeka Taylor, where Mia stayed up until three o'clock and was woken early because Lilly forced her to go to a soccer game to promote her campaign) and meets his roommate, Doo Pak, where she discovers condoms in Michael's bathroom. Shocked by this discovery, Mia has The Talk with Michael, who says he knows Mia isn't ready because she invited her friends for a sleepover once she found out she had a hotel room to herself, and not him. Michael tells her he understands, but is not going to wait forever and Mia begins to think that Michael is going to break up with her. Lilly reveals that she doesn't actually want Mia to be student counsel president and wants her to immediately resign in favor of Lilly if she is elected.

Mia debates against Lana (a debate which is also televised), and provides a much more convincing argument than Lana and gets the majority of the vote. Mia realizes that she wants to be president herself, when Michael shows up at school and Mia leaves with him. Michael assures Mia he does not want to break up with her, nor for her to have sex before she is ready and the two agree to wait for three months before taking the issue further.

References 

2005 American novels
American young adult novels

The Princess Diaries novels
HarperCollins books